The Austin Spurs are an American basketball team in the NBA G League based in Cedar Park, Texas, and are affiliated with the San Antonio Spurs. The team plays their home games at H-E-B Center at Cedar Park. The team has made the postseason in 8 out of 14 seasons in the NBA Development League.

On October 15, 2014, after the San Antonio Spurs purchased the franchise, the team colors and logo were changed to reflect the silver and black motif used by the Spurs.

The Spurs are coached by Petar Božić. Their general manager is Brent Barry.

Franchise history
The Austin Spurs were established in Columbus, Georgia, as the Columbus Riverdragons. The franchise in 2005 was sold to Southwest Basketball, LLC, and were relocated to the city of Austin, Texas. Following the relocation, the franchise changed their name and logo becoming the Austin Toros, which was unveiled on August 10, 2005. The Toros name was the only NBA-associated team and first D-League team to possess a nickname of Spanish origin. The Toros began play during the 2005–06 season.

On June 28, 2007, the Toros were acquired by the San Antonio Spurs, becoming the second D-League team to be owned by an NBA team, after the Los Angeles D-Fenders were purchased by the Los Angeles Lakers in 2006.

On August 9, 2010, the Toros announced they would move to the Cedar Park Center from the Austin Convention Center and for the 2010–11 season.

On April 28, 2012, the Toros defeated the Los Angeles D-Fenders in Game 3 of the NBA D-League Finals to capture their first championship in franchise history.

On October 15, 2014, the team announced that they would be changing their name to the Austin Spurs, in reference to their parent team.

On April 10, 2018, the Spurs defeated Raptors 905 to secure their second G League championship.

In 2019, the Spurs played in the 2019 FIBA Intercontinental Cup in Rio de Janeiro, as the first G League team to play in the tournament. Austin lost in the semi-final to Flamengo.

In 2020, the Spurs named Tyler Self, son of Hall of Fame coach Bill Self, as the Austin Spurs' general manager and Matt Nielsen as the head coach. Due to the COVID-19 pandemic, the team played an abbreviated 2020–21 bubble season in Orlando.

Prior to the 2021–22 season, Petar Božić was named Austin's head coach after Nielsen was moved over to San Antonio as an assistant coach.

Prior to the 2022–23 season, Brent Barry was named Austin Spurs' general manager.

Home arenas
 Columbus Civic Center (2001–2005)
 Austin Convention Center (2005–2010)
 H-E-B Center at Cedar Park (2010–present)

Season-by-season

Current roster

Players with NBA experience

NBA call-ups

Head coaches

NBA affiliates

Columbus Riverdragons
None

Austin Toros
Boston Celtics (2006–2007)
Denver Nuggets (2005–2006)
Houston Rockets (2005–2007)
Los Angeles Clippers (2005–2006)
San Antonio Spurs (2005–2014)

Austin Spurs
San Antonio Spurs (2014–present)

In international competitions

FIBA Intercontinental Cup

 Champions   Runners-up   Third place   Fourth place

References

External links

 Official Austin Spurs website

 
Basketball teams in Texas
Basketball teams established in 2005
Spurs Sports & Entertainment
Sports in Austin, Texas
2005 establishments in Texas